Portrait of Countess Antonietta Negroni Prati Morosini as a Child is an 1858 oil on canvas portrait by Francesco Hayez, commissioned by the subject's father Alessandro Negroni Prati Morosini. It is now in the Galleria d'Arte Moderna in Milan, to which it was given in 1935 by Anna Cristina del Mayno Casati. It was the subject of a 300 lire Poste Italiane stamp in 1982 as part of a series on Italian art.

References

1858 paintings
Children in art
Morosini
Paintings in the Galleria d'Arte Moderna, Milan